Lü Yanzhi (1894–1929) was a Chinese architect. He won the competitions to design both the Sun Yat-sen Mausoleum in Nanjing and the Sun Yat-sen Memorial Hall in Guangzhou. Lü died the year that the memorial hall began construction in 1929; it was eventually completed in 1931.

Background
Lü spent part of his childhood in Paris. He earned a degree in architecture from Cornell University, in the United States, in 1918 and then worked for Murphy & Dana until 1921, when he went into independent practice in Shanghai. Among projects he worked on with the firm are Ginling College in Nanjing and Yenching University in Beijing.

Career 
Lü's firm, whose name translates as "C. Lü Architect", was the first Chinese-owned architectural firm. In 1924, with Fan Wenzhou, he co-founded the first Chinese architectural association. Considered one of the most gifted Chinese architects of his generation, Lü won two prestigious national design competitions, for the Sun Yat-sen Mausoleum in September 1925, and for the Sun Yat-sen Memorial Hall the following year. He died of cancer in 1929 and the Memorial Hall commission was completed by Li Jinpei.

In keeping with the competition guidelines but also with the historicising impulse exemplified by Murphy & Dana's collegiate buildings, Lü's designs for both major commissions adapt traditional Chinese design features to modern uses. His writings describe this as a means of asserting Chinese nationhood against foreign imperialism. Liang Sicheng later criticised him for using only superficial aspects of Chinese architecture, which he wrote led to "a series of mistakes in proportions" in the hall in the mausoleum. Other early historians of 20th-century Chinese architecture have also represented him as merely a draftsman, due in part to Henry Murphy describing him as such after he won the contest to design the mausoleum.

Lü Yanzhi and Huang Tanpu 

Huang Tanpu (also known as T.P.WONG, March 27, 1898 - January 20, 1969, born in Taishan, Guangdong Province of China) has followed his uncle to England by the age of 13 and been adopted later by Miss Claic.B. Milchell, a teacher at Leeds Secondary School.

After graduating from Leeds University, he met LU Yanzhi in Paris's Louvre museum at the beginning of 1921 during the trip back to China and since then they've become close friends and partners. In March 1922, they co-founded the " Gen Yue & Co "( pinyin: ZHENYU Company ), in which LU was engaged as architect and Huang undertook the business.

In September 1925, Lu won the first prize of Dr. Sun Yat-sen's Mausoleum Design Awards. The company then announced the establishment of "YanKee Architects". In March 1926, HUANG delivered the speech at the groundbreaking ceremony of Nanjing's Sun Yat-sen Mausoleum on the behalf of LU Yanzhi.  Since then he represented Lu for the communication with the media and the government, the organization and the public speeches etc. In November 1926, they signed another architecture's contract on Mr. Sun Yat-sen's Guangzhou Memorial Hall.  In 1927, LU felt serious illness (cancer), HUANG was asked by LU to be his total representative, to continue on the 2 great constructions in Nanjing and Guangzhou. From 1929 to 1932, Huang hired  Shanghai famous Wang Kai Photography, to photograph the third period of the construction process of Nanjing Sun's Mausoleum

and Guangzhou Memorial Hall to record the truth about the construction process of these two great national memorial buildings.

After Lu's death, the “YanKee Architects Office” under Gen Yue & Co  was renamed as “YanPoy Kee Architects Office” ( another famous Architect POY G. LEE was invited to join the Architects Office)

In December 1934, Huang married Huang Zhengqiu, the golden key winner of Yenching University (燕京大學; pinyin: Yanjing Daxue). Her grandfather is Wong Kai Kah (1860—1906)(pinyin: Huang Kaijia, one of the earliest official students sent to United States in Qing Dynasty) .

In 1935, Huang bought the land and constructed a family residence in Shanghai Hongqiao Rd. to serve as a permanent secure collection place for those invaluable architect drawings and documents.  In 1944–1945, during the anti-Janpanese war, Huang employed some workers to dig the air raid shelters in the garden to place the collections, for ensuring their safety. In May 1949, the PLA army of Chinese Communist Party occupied Shanghai. In 1950, one day Huang's family suddenly received the expropriation notice from Shanghai Municipal Military Association, asked for the requisition of the house in order to accommodate the officers of Soviet Air Forced Military, and the family must be moved out within 72 hours...  At that time, Huang was in Hong Kong, and Mrs HUANG guided the family relations  to move away all the architectural drawings, pictures, and Lu's books and materials etc...

After the Hongqiao house was expropriated, some large wooden cases containing these historical treasures were relocated many times and finally been moved to a small apartment  where the family settled down.

In February 1951, HUANG was put into prison . His Hongqiao house was confiscated and his company also stopped business. At the end of 1953,released from prison. In 1956, he donated a great part of collections to the government.

In 1959, one more time, he was sentenced to  imprisonment. In order to survive, Mrs.HUANG began to sell parts of the collections, which were discovered later by an old librarian worked in the Shanghai Archives. Some of the collections were finally transferred later to Guangzhou.

On 20 January 1969, Huang  passed away. His grave was settled in the neighbor city Suzhou countryside in Jiangsu Province.

After 2000, this history was gradually recognized.

In 2012, some donation materials, contributed by Huang and his future generations, were exhibited in Nanjing Sun Yat-sen Memorial House.

References

Further reading

1894 births
1929 deaths
Chinese architects
Cornell University alumni
People from Tianjin
Tsinghua University alumni